The Magnetic Tree is a Chilean Spanish co-produced film written and directed by Isabel de Ayguavives and filmed in Chile.
The Magnetic Tree is Isabel de Ayguavives' debut feature film.

The film premiered at the 2013 San Sebastián International Film Festival.

Plot 
Bruno, a young immigrant, returns to Chile from Germany after a long absence and stays with his cousins in the countryside. The family is gathered to bid farewell to their house, which is about to be sold. During their stay, they visit a local curiosity that Bruno remembers fondly - the "Magnetic Tree". The tree has a mysterious magnetic force so powerful that it can pull cars towards itself.

As the family spends time together, they engage in free and open conversations that reveal the complex emotions that come with familial relationships.

Cast 
Andrés Gertrúdix
Catalina Saavedra
Manuela Martelli
Gonzalo Robles
Juan Pablo Larenas
Daniel Alcaíno
Edgardo Bruna
Lisette Lastra

Production 
 The movie is a Chilean-Spanish production by Dos Treinta y Cinco P.C, Parox, and Instituto de la Cinematografía y de las Artes Audiovisuales .

Awards 
 San Sebastian Film Festival Nominated: Kutxa – New Director Award

Reception 
 The film had generally positive reception.
 Twitchfilm review: "The strongest element of the movie, written and directed by Isabel de Ayguavives, is how it manages to recreate that feeling of a family reunion, specially when it comes to Chile."
 Cineuropa review: "Ayguavives has created a mosaic of different situations that combine to form a subtle reflection on that damned nostalgia that can sometimes end up weighing down too heavily on us."
 The Hollywood Reporter: “Lively and intimate, it's a film made by someone whose interest in and compassion for her people is deep and forgiving.” Jonathan Holland, The Hollywood Reporter.

References

External links 
 The Magnetic Tree Official webpage

Films shot in Chile
2013 films
Spanish drama films
2010s Spanish-language films
Films about immigration
Films set in Chile
Films about trees
2013 drama films
Chilean drama films
2010s Chilean films